Astrid Höfte is a Paralympian athlete from Germany competing mainly in category F44 long jump and T44 sprint events.

She competed in the 2008 Summer Paralympics in Beijing, China. There she won a bronze medal in the women's F44 long jump event.  She also competed in the T44 100m and 200m making the final in both events.

External links
 

Paralympic athletes of Germany
Athletes (track and field) at the 2008 Summer Paralympics
Paralympic bronze medalists for Germany
Living people
Year of birth missing (living people)
Medalists at the 2008 Summer Paralympics
Paralympic medalists in athletics (track and field)
German female sprinters
German female long jumpers
21st-century German women